Francis Lake is a small backcountry lake in the Sierra Nevada mountain range, to the west of Lake Tahoe in the Eldorado National Forest. There are no trails to this lake. This lake is very near Loon Lake.

See also
List of lakes in California

References

Lakes of the Sierra Nevada (United States)
Lakes of El Dorado County, California
Eldorado National Forest
Lake Tahoe
Lakes of California
Lakes of Northern California